Jean-Julien is a given name. Notable people with the name include:

 Jean-Julien Chervier (born 1971), French writer and film director
 Jean-Julien Lemordant (1882-1968), Breton artist and French soldier and patriot
 Jean-Julien Rojer (born 1981), Dutch professional tennis player

See also 
 Jean Jullien (disambiguation)
 Jean (male given name)
 Julien (given name)

Compound given names
French masculine given names